Gervasi may refer to:

Places 
 Sarrià-Sant Gervasi, one of the biggest districts in the north-west of Barcelona, Catalonia (Spain).
 Sant Gervasi – Galvany, a neighborhood in the Sarrià-Sant Gervasi district of Barcelona
 Sant Gervasi – la Bonanova, a neighborhood in the Sarrià-Sant Gervasi district of Barcelona

People 
 David Gervasi (born 1983), Swiss decathlete
 Frank Gervasi (1908–1990), American foreign correspondent and author
 Luigi Gervasi, Italian set decorator active in the 1950s and 1960s
 Sacha Gervasi (born 1966), British-American filmmaker